Gu Yue (1937 – July 2, 2005), originally named Hu Shixue (胡诗学), was a Chinese actor. Noted for his uncanny resemblance to Mao Zedong, with whom he shares a birthday, he played the former Chinese leader 84 times from 1978 until his death. He won the Best Actor titles at China's Hundred Flowers Awards in 1990 and again in 1993. On July 2, 2005, while staying in southern China, Gu suffered a heart attack shortly after bathing in a sauna and was rushed to a hospital, where he was pronounced dead at 11:09 pm.

External links

1937 births
2005 deaths
Male actors from Wuhan
Chinese male film actors
Chinese male television actors